The 1927 Western State Teachers Hilltoppers football team represented Western State Teachers College (later renamed Western Michigan University) as an independent during the 1927 college football season.  In their fourth season under head coach Earl Martineau, the Hilltoppers compiled a 3–4 record and outscored their opponents, 100 to 72. Halfback/center George Fulgoni was the team captain.

Schedule

References

Western State Teachers
Western Michigan Broncos football seasons
Western State Teachers Hilltoppers football